Chamaemyia triorbiseta is a species of fly in the family Chamaemyiidae. It is found in Scotland.

References

Chamaemyiidae
Insects described in 1990
Muscomorph flies of Europe